Rhodochytrium is a genus of green algae in the family Chlorochytriaceae.

References

Chlamydomonadales
Chlamydomonadales genera